Ludovico Marracci (6 October 1612 – 5 February 1700), also known by Luigi Marracci, was an Italian Oriental scholar and professor of Arabic in the College of Wisdom at Rome.

He is chiefly known as the publisher and editor of Quran of Muhammad in Arabic. He is also well known for translating Quran in Latin, editing an Arabic Bible translation, and numerous other works.

Biography
He was born at Lucca in 1612. He had become a member of the Clerics Regular of the Mother of God of Lucca and learnt with reputed success in the study of non-European languages, especially Arabic. He was the Confessor of Pope Innocent XI. Pope appointed him as the professor of Arabic in the College of Wisdom - Sapienza University of Rome (in Italian, sapienza means wisdom), for his proficiency in that language. In 1665 he was part of the team that debunked the lead tablets of Granada.

He later declined the promotion of being appointed to the  rank of Cardinal of the Catholic Church. He died at an age of 88 in 1700.

He authored The Life of Father Leonardi, the founder of the Clerics Regular of the Mother of God of Lucca, and many more.

In 2012, a collection of his manuscripts were discovered at the Order of Clerics Regular of the Mother of God in Rome. The collection consists of almost 10,000 pages. The manuscripts include his work material, notes and significant information on his approach to translating the Qurʻan, as well as different versions of his translation. Based on the study of these manuscripts, a new examination of his life, influence, and methods has been published.

Arabic Bible
He has considerable share in editing the Roman edition of the Arabic Bible, published in 1671 in three volumes. For this, the Congregation for the Evangelization of Peoples appointed Abraham Ecchellensis and Ludovico Marracci to undertake the revision of the edition to make it exactly correspond with the Vulgate. Marracci wrote a new preface and made a list of errors of the former copy in 1668.

Vatican Quran
Ludovico Marracci acquired much fame in editing and publishing the Qurʻan in Arabic with his translation into Latin.

Alcorani Textus Universus Arabicè et Latinè, was published in two volumes, at Padua in 1698. His version of the Qurʻan included a life of Muhammad, with notes, and refutations of Muslim doctrines. It was the result of forty years of labour and toilsome research of the Benedictines. He also published in 1691, in Latin, a refutation of the Quran titled Prodromus Ad Refutationem Alcoran.

Marracci's Islamic texts included Ibn Abī Zamanīn, Thaʿlabī, Zamakhsharī, Baydִāwī and Suyūtִī.

Alcorani'''s ‘Introduction’ (Prodromus) had been published seven years earlier in 1691.

George Sale's English translation of the Qurʻan, The Alcoran of Mohammed'', in 1736, was done based on Marracci's 1698 Latin translation.

References

External links
 The Quran in East and West: Manuscripts and Printed Books
 Alcorani Textus Universus
 SALE’S PREFACE TO THE PRELIMINARY DISCOURSE AND TRANSLATION. - Mohammed, The Quran, vol. 1 - 1896 - Father Lewis Marracci, who had been confessor to Pope InnocentXI
 Ludovico Maracci
  The history of Arabia - by Andrew Crichton - p.277-278

17th-century Italian Roman Catholic priests
Translators of the Quran into Latin
1612 births
1700 deaths
17th-century translators
Catholicism and Islam]